ACE DuraFlo is a cured-in-place pipe treatment that creates an epoxy barrier coating on the inside of existing piping systems. This process has the capability to rehabilitate pressurized pipes including potable water, fire sprinklers and natural gas lines ranging in diameter from 3/8 of an inch to six inches.

Process 
Pipes are restored in place. The process provides a barrier coating protecting the pipe from internal corrosion, repairs pinhole leaks and prevents the leaching of piping materials into the product carried in the pipe.

References

External links
 Information on U.S. Patent no. 7160574: 
 Information on U.S. Patent no. 7517409: 

Plumbing